Day of the Outlaw is a 1959 Western film starring Robert Ryan, Burl Ives, and Tina Louise. It was directed by Andre DeToth; this was DeToth's final Western feature film.

Plot
Blaise Starrett is a ruthless cattleman who helped found the small, bleak community of Bitters, Wyoming. He is at odds with homesteaders who, having established new farms in the area, have taken to putting up barbed wire to keep their livestock from wandering. Starrett is particularly aggrieved with Hal Crane, who not only inspired this use of barbed wire, but is also married to Helen, the woman Starrett loves.

In spite of the fact that Helen has told him she can never love him if he carries out his threat to murder her husband, Starrett sets his mind on doing just that. The stage is set for a final, bloody showdown when into town rides Jack Bruhn and his band of rogue cavalry men.

This gang holds the town hostage while Bruhn, wounded in a recent bank robbery, receives treatment. Realizing that they would have no qualms about wiping Bitters out, Starrett tries to save his town. He takes the gang out into the desolate landscape, ostensibly to help them escape across the snow-covered mountains.

Cast
 Robert Ryan as Blaise Starrett  
 Burl Ives as Jack Bruhn  
 Tina Louise as Helen Crane  
 Alan Marshal as Hal Crane  
 Venetia Stevenson as Ernine, Vic's Daughter  
 David Nelson as Gene, Bruhn's Gang  
 Nehemiah Persoff as Dan, Starret's Foreman  
 Jack Lambert as Tex (Bruhn's gang) 
 Lance Fuller as Pace (Bruhn's gang) 
 Frank DeKova as Denver, Bruhn's Gang (as Frank deKova)  
 Elisha Cook Jr. as Larry Teter (town barber) (as Elisha Cook)  
 Dabbs Greer as Doc Langer, Veterinarian  
 Betsy Jones-Moreland as Mrs. Preston (as Betsey Jones-Moreland)  
 Helen Westcott as Vivian
 Paul Wexler as Vause
 Michael McGreevey as Bobby

Production
The film was based on a 1955 novel of the same title by Lee Edwin Wells (1907-1982), that also ran in several newspapers as a serialized story in the fall of 1955 and others in the late summer 1956.

Producer Buddy Adler originally purchased the film rights as a vehicle for Robert Wagner.

Philip Yordan read the novel and insisted on writing a script based on the book. Filmed in central Oregon at Dutchman Flat and Todd Lake Meadows near the town of Bend in late November and early December 1958, with Leon Chooluck the unit director doing many of the long exterior shots.

Yordan called the script "one of the best I've ever written," but said the problem with the film was that the budget, at $400,000, was not big enough. Yordan told author Franklin Jarlett, in his biographical book about Robert Ryan, that DeToth was having personal problems at the time of filming and it was apparent on the set. Other problems included Ryan's being out for a week with pneumonia; snowstorms causing delays in filming; DeToth's changing his mind about where some scenes were to be shot (from interior to remote exteriors); and finally running out of money, packing up, and going back to Hollywood. Yordan lamented what "could have been."

Reception
Roger Horrocks, in his book Male Myths and Icons, says that the film is a 'gold nugget' and on par with the Westerns of Budd Boetticher.

References

External links
 
 
 

1959 films
1959 Western (genre) films
American Western (genre) films
Films directed by Andre DeToth
Films set in Wyoming
Films based on Western (genre) novels
Films based on American novels
Films shot in Bend, Oregon
Revisionist Western (genre) films
1950s English-language films
1950s American films